Khash County is in Sistan and Baluchestan province, Iran. The capital of the county is the city of Khash. At the 2006 census, the county's population was 161,918 in 32,478 households. The following census in 2011 counted 155,652 people in 35,476 households. At the 2016 census, the county's population was 173,821 in 48,396 households. After the census, Nukabad District was separated from the county to form Taftan County.

Administrative divisions

The population history and structural changes of Khash County's administrative divisions over three consecutive censuses are shown in the following table. The latest census shows three districts, 11 rural districts, and two cities.

References

 

Counties of Sistan and Baluchestan Province